Agios Ioannis (Greek for Saint John) is a district of Limassol Municipality.

Location 
To the west it borders with Omonoia , to the north with Apostolos Andreas, to the east with Katholiki, to the southeast with Arnaoutogitonia and to the south with Tsiflikoudia.

Sport Teams and Establishments 
In the district of Agios Ioannis are the Indoor Stadium Nikos Solomonidis (owned by AEL Limassol ) and the Indoor stadium Apollon Limassol (owned by Apollon Limassol ).

Area Map 

Communities in Limassol District